The Pukaskwa River is a river in Thunder Bay District and Algoma District in Northern Ontario, Canada. It is in the Great Lakes Basin and is a tributary of Lake Superior, which it enters at the south end of Pukaskwa National Park. It is a remote, pristine, free-flowing, medium-sized Shield river, with lots of whitewater, best travelled in spring.

The river's name is said to come from the Ojibwa word "Pukasu", which refers to cooking the marrow in the bones of animals. The legend is that a native of the area is said to have killed his wife, burned the bones and thrown them into the river.

The Pukaskwa River was featured in the artwork and films of Bill Mason, including Waterwalker (1984).

Geography
The river begins at Gibson Lake which straddles the border between Algoma District and Thunder Bay District. The river exits the lake in Algoma District, travels southwest into Thunder Bay District and into Jarvey Lake, which also straddles the border. It passes into Algoma District then back into Thunder Bay District before leaving Jarvey Lake at the south west heading in a southwest direction. it briefly turns west, takes in the right tributary Fox River, and heads south. The river resumes a southwest course, enters geographic Homer Township, takes in the left tributary East Pukaskwa River, flows over the Schist Falls, and reaches its mouth at Lake Superior.

From upstream of the East Pukaskwa River confluence to the river mouth, the Pukaskwa River forms the southern boundary of Pukaskwa National Park.

Tributaries
Robin Creek (right)
East Pukaskwa River (left)
Perry Creek (right)
Fox River (right)
Coronation Creek (left)

Pukaskwa River Provincial Park

The remaining  of the river is protected in the adjacent Pukaskwa National Park. It was established in 2002 and offers a remote whitewater river experience for persons with advanced canoeing and camping skills.

The park features "spectacular scenery" as the Pukaskwa River flows through lakes and small wetlands that are linked by bedrock channels with shallow sandy till rock uplands and sand and gravel deposits.

It is a non-operating park, meaning that there are no services. The only facilities provided are 4 backcountry campsites. Permitted activities include boating, canoeing, fishing, and hunting.

Canoeing
Canoeing the Pukaskwa River is considered to be challenging due to its remoteness and difficulty, and navigable only during spring run-off, from May to early June. Once reaching the river's mouth, paddlers will require a boat shuttle or a lengthy paddle along the undeveloped coast of Lake Superior to reach civilization (either  paddle north to the Park's office at Hattie Cove, or a  paddle east to Michipicoten).

The river has some 57 rapids that can be run in high water, ranging from Class I to IV. One notable whitewater section is the Ringham’s Gorge, a  whitewater canyon. There are also a few Class V rapids and several waterfalls that need to be portaged.

See also
List of rivers of Ontario

References

Sources

Rivers of Thunder Bay District
Rivers of Algoma District
Tributaries of Lake Superior